Joel Christian Goffin (born December 7, 1981) is an American film composer and music producer.

Goffin formed The Midnight Foundation musical group with Andrew Suhren. He was a cast member of the 2003 short film Dead Wait directed and written by Alton Glass.

In 2011, his work on the soundtrack for the film Inale won  Best Soundtrack at the Africa Movie Academy Awards.

Awards 

St Tropez International Film Festival
 2015: Cotton (Best Original Score) Won

Blue Whiskey Independent Film Festival
 2015: Cotton (Best Original Score) Won

NAFCA Awards
 2015: Black November (Best Original Score) Nominated

Filmography

References

External links 

1981 births
Living people
American film score composers
American male film score composers